Guchin-Us (Thirty water) is a sum (district) of Övörkhangai Province in southern Mongolia. It had an estimated 2,260 inhabitants in 2008.

The town of Arguut, 104 km from the Province capital Arvaikheer, is the administrative center of the sum, but mostly it is called "Guchin Us" as well.

There are several prehistoric rock paintings and buddhist inscriptions in the north-east of the town, close to the unpaved road to Arvaikheer.

References 

Districts of Övörkhangai Province